Sabatinca quadrijuga is a species of moth belonging to the family Micropterigidae. This species is endemic to New Zealand and is found in the Dunedin area and in Southland. The range of S. quadrijuga overlaps with the range of S. caustica. S. quadrijuga was first scientifically described by Edward Meyrick in 1912. As a result of its predominantly black forewings this species looks similar to a small caddisfly. The adults of this species are on the wing from September to November. Larvae feed on leafy liverwort species and the adults likely feed on fern spores or sedge pollen. The species prefers to live in well lit but damp mossy habitats. The nearest relative of S. quadrijuga is S. aurantissima.

Taxonomy 
This species was first described by Edward Meyrick in 1912 using a specimen collected by Alfred Philpott in Invercargill. The holotype specimen is held at the Natural History Museum, London.

Description

Meyrick described the species as follows:
The forewings of S. quadrijuga are predominantly black, and this ensures it looks similar to a small black caddisfly. The nearest relative of S. quadrijuga is S. aurantissima.

Distribution 
This species is endemic to New Zealand. It is found in Dunedin area and in Southland. The range of S. quadrijuga overlaps with the range of S. caustica.

Behaviour 
The adults of this species are on the wing from September to November.

Host species and habitat 
The larvae of this species feeds on foliose liverwort species and the adults likely feed on fern spores or sedge pollen. Adults are known to fly close to the ground and prefer well lit damp mossy habitats.

References

Micropterigidae
Moths described in 1912
Endemic fauna of New Zealand
Moths of New Zealand
Taxa named by Edward Meyrick
Endemic moths of New Zealand